The rivalry between King's College London and University College London has been a part of London life for nearly two centuries. It has been expressed in the academic sphere, on the sports field and in the rivalry of the student populations. It can be traced to their foundation in the 1820s when King's College was established as the Anglican counterpart to the secular University College.

Origins 

King's College was founded in 1829 in response to the founding of "London University", latterly known as University College London, in 1826. UCL was founded, with the backing of Jews, Utilitarians and non-Anglican Christians, as a secular institution, intended to educate "the youth of our middling rich people between the ages of 15 or 16 and 20 or later". The principal objective of King's College was "to imbue the minds of youth with a knowledge of the doctrines and duties of Christianity, as inculcated by the United Church of England and Ireland". At King's, attendance at college chapel and the study of Christianity formed an important part of college life.

The rivalry can be glimpsed in the second verse of an 1820s satirical song set to the music of the British national anthem:

King's College lads arise!
New Universities
Shall quickly fall;
Confound their politics,
Frustrate their teaching tricks,
O, Church! on thee we fix,
Maintain us all

One of the earliest potentially violent consequences of the contrasting styles and purposes of the two colleges arose when the Earl of Winchilsea, one of the principal financial donors to the fledgling King's College, accused its leading patron, the Duke of Wellington, of seeking to water down the orthodox, Protestant, character of the new College.

Wellington had recently played a central role in securing Catholic Emancipation and Winchilsea, an opponent of emancipation, feared that he planned to turn King's College London into a 'Catholic Seminary' as the new college was to place no religious test for entry. Early in 1829 Winchilsea publicly challenged Wellington about the Duke's simultaneous support for the Anglican King's College and the Roman Catholic Relief Act 1829. The result was a duel in Battersea Fields on 21 March. Shots were fired but no-one was hurt. Duel Day is still celebrated annually at King's in March.

Student Rags 

Student Rags were manifestations of the rivalry between the two institutions and first became popular in the late nineteenth century. Student rags often featured cross-dressing and processions that mirrored official celebrations as a way of challenging authority whilst raising money for charity. Rags were "colourful, subversive, and occasionally dangerous" for both participants and bystanders and reached their height between the two World Wars. A long-running campaign of the rags were the attempts to capture each other's mascots. Running battles were supposedly brought to an end by the colleges' authorities in the first half of the twentieth century, but rivalry amongst the University of London's colleges continues to this day.

Early student social activity in London tended to be quite serious and worthy in its expression, characterised by programmes of lectures, debates and sporting fixtures. However, this began to change by the 1890s, which witnessed boisterous 'Town and Gown' antics by students which continued into Edwardian times.

The first real rag at King's occurred in 1912. Angry student anti-vivisectionists complained that a small dog had been vivisected repeatedly and unnecessarily and erected a statue of the animal in Battersea Park. Indignant students from London medical schools quickly moved to destroy the statue, in the course of which a struggle took place with police and some students arrested and fined. They later reconvened in the King's quad with an effigy of the offending magistrate that was set on fire and thrown into the river.

The First World War for some constituted a cultural watershed in attitudes to established authority. Many members of staff and students of British universities saw active service and the experience of the veteran undoubtedly influenced the progress of the student rag after the war. The rags of the 1920s were well attended and often organised with military precision. They received considerable press coverage not least for their impact on local communities

Edith Summerskill, medical student at King's in the 1920s and later Minister of National Insurance, reflecting on the contrast between the informal behaviour of her contemporaries with the more serious post-1945 student, observed that, "We were all too busy relaxing after the war, gayer, more high spirited and after a good time', going on to suggest that 'the 1914–18 war was far more terrible than this last war ... consequently the reaction after the war was more marked."

College mascots 

Rivalry in the twentieth century between students of the two colleges was centred on their respective mascots. University College's was Phineas Maclino, a wooden tobacconist's sign of a kilted Jacobite Highlander purloined from outside a shop in Tottenham Court Road during the celebrations of the Relief of Ladysmith in 1900.

King's later addition was a giant beer bottle representing "bottled youth". In December 1923 it was replaced by a new mascot to rival Phineas – Reggie the Lion, a copper lion from a junkyard (also off Tottenham Court Road) for whom King's students paid £7, that was christened Reggie at a special meeting. Reggie made his debut at a King's-UCL sporting rag in December 1923, protected by a lifeguard of engineering students armed with T-squares. Thereafter, Reggie formed the centrepiece of annual freshers' processions by King's students around Aldwych.

Kidnappings 

Reggie was the victim of repeated kidnapping attempts by UCL and other London colleges following the Second World War. On one occasion he was transported to Inverness and on another was ignominiously dumped at the Surrey beauty spot of the Devil's Punchbowl. The most notable episode involved his painful emasculation by UCL students armed with a tin opener. Thankfully, he was restored to full working order by a team of engineers and medics and filled with concrete to prevent further kidnap attempts by the Bloomsbury students. Likewise, UCL mascots have been kidnapped over the years, with the tarring and feathering of Phineas and the infamous theft of preserved Jeremy Bentham's head. Mascot theft has since died down with both university's mascots more securely protected.

1919–1938: Heyday of the rag

The Interwar period witnessed the flourishing of the student rag and of the friendly rivalry between King's and UCL. College union societies greatly expanded their sporting, social and charitable activities at this time and in 1921 the University of London Union Society was formed as an umbrella organisation. Rags comprised well-organised kidnappings, the collection for charity by students dressed as the opposite sex or in elaborate costumes, processions and mock battles.

Great rag of 1922
The contest between King's and UCL reached new levels in December 1922 when King's captured Phineas from his usual residence in Tottenham Court Road. When King's ignored an ultimatum demanding his return, hundreds of UCL students, transported in furniture vans from Bloomsbury or arriving at Aldwych tube station, stormed the King's quad.

King's was defended by the college gun, re-equipped with a powerful hose pipe, whilst Phineas stood on the college's main steps with a personal bodyguard of engineering students armed with rotten fruit and vegetables from the nearby Covent Garden Market. Having taken the precaution to switch off the college's water supply at the mains, UCL students engaged their rivals resulting in several injuries and the collapse of part of a King's College stone balustrade. Police were called and a truce was enforced.

UCL and King's students then marched back to Gower Street in good spirits accompanied by the battered but dignified Phineas. The University College mascot soon disappeared again the following spring. King's was initially suspected but this time it was students of Caius College, Cambridge, who carried out the abduction.

The 1922 quad battle was viewed with alarm by the college authorities. The union reminded students that the quadrangle was a "dangerous and unsuitable place for ... rags" and the editor of the King's student journal went as far as to suggest a premeditated and deliberate aspect to the violence. It was, he said, "a good rag ... but got out of hand. It is a pity that the blinding of Mr Johnson…has not taught us that there is a limit."
 
The collapse of the balustrade was widely reported in the press with the Daily News describing a "Rag Beyond the Limit" and speculating that a release of liquid oxygen stored below the accident area might have led to a violent explosion. King's principal and University College's provost both agreed that although it was a tradition that any damages caused by a rag should be borne by the students responsible, that in this instance the repair bill of £237 should be collectively shared by students of both colleges.

1927 – Students storm University College
Two weeks of revelry characterised the 1927 rag. It began when UCL briefly captured Reggie and filled his body with rotten apples before returning him to King's. The response was swift: a contingent of female King's students drove to University College at dawn chanting, "For Reggie!" while their colleagues stole in via the rear entrance and captured a bust of Jeremy Bentham. The following day, King's students goaded their rivals by parading the bust outside University College.

Hostilities recommenced a week later centred on the UCL quad: the ammunition a variety of rotten eggs, fruit and vegetables. At least six students were injured and taken to nearby University College Hospital for treatment following the commencement of hostilities at 2 pm. King's were quickly reinforced by lorries carrying Covent Garden market refuse but many of their contingent, including Reggie, were trapped after police ordered the shutting of the UCL gates. Only a last minute scramble and the hauling of Reggie over the gates saved the King's commander-in-chief from the ignominy of capture and ransom.

As with the rag of 1922, the college authorities responded with a public tightening of discipline and a warning that "any further disturbances created by the students of the college with students of University College will be regarded as a breach of discipline and treated accordingly."

1929
The sports' ground at Mitcham became the scene of a rag between UCL and King's in December when rival groups hurled rotten fruit and vegetables from lorries. The encounter followed a secret operation the previous night when King's students had infiltrated UCL's grounds and tarred and feathered one of the statues in front of the entrance.

1938–1945: World War II

The rivalry was suspended during World War II because of the evacuation of faculties to provincial cities and the change in mood which was summed up by a representative at the British Students' congress at Leeds who spoke of the need for students to contribute to the war effort and not be viewed as 'dilettante idiots'.

1950–present

The truce survived until 1950, when hostilities between the colleges broke out afresh during the Bonfire celebrations on 5 November. King's students stormed the UCL quad, setting fire to two large pyres and throwing fireworks from the college steps.  While this was happening, two thousand UCL students circled Piccadilly Circus in painted lorries, to demand a lengthening of pub opening hours.  Thirteen arrests followed when flour was thrown and a fight broke out over a stuffed kangaroo.

The last traditional rags took place in the 1950s. In 1952, police broke up a series of races in the Strand between King's and UCL students dressed as camels and a cow. More daringly, in 1956, King's Engineers grabbed Phineas from a cabinet in the University College Union after melting off its locks, the very day before the visit of the Queen Mother to inspect the Scottish Highlander. A tarred and feathered Phineas was restored with moments to spare.

Across the United Kingdom, student priorities began to change with the enlargement of the university sector in the 1960s. The growth of provincial higher education both enhanced the possibilities for the rag and the dangers of 'town and gown' tensions between permanent local, and transient student, populations. Universities across Britain tried to build bridges with local people, especially through fund raising initiatives for local charities. However, the 1960s, 70s and 80s all bore witness to a more politically aware student population with demonstrations and sit-ins against Vietnam, university cuts and the poll tax. In this more highly charged climate, the traditional rag might have looked anachronistic and somewhat juvenile.

Nevertheless, there remained a place for conventional high spirits, in particular occasioned by King's renewed participation in the Lord Mayor's Show.

Today, annual RAG events take place in universities throughout the United Kingdom to raise money for charities. The days of the sometimes dangerous outcomes of Student Rags, such as the fate of visiting American temperance evangelist, "Pussyfoot" Johnson who lost an eye in a battle with King's students in 1919, are over.

Women

The involvement of women in rags drew considerable comment during the 1920s. Under a headline "Women and those 'Rags'", a The Star reporter claimed in 1929 that most women students were disdainful of the activities. Miss Paul, a tutor to women students at King's, insisted portentously that "displays of boisterousness were really exclusively men's affairs". However, women clearly played a central role in 1920s rags, including the raid on University College in 1927.

Other intercollegiate rivalries within the University of London

Within the University of London student rivalry was not confined to King's and UCL, but spilled over into contests with Imperial, Queen Mary colleges and the London School of Economics.

One well-planned and successful rag against the LSE during the 1920s involved the King's Liberal Party Society organising an impostor to play the part of David Lloyd George, complete with morning coat and limousine, who proceeded to address the LSE Students' Union in an appropriately overdramatic performance. A riot ensued when the angry audience realised they had been duped and the actor sent flying before rescue by a strategically placed King's rowing heavy.

Following the Second World War, King's was involved in numerous kidnapping and ransoming of rival mascots, including Queen Mary's leopard and the LSE Penguin.

In 1935 a failed attempt was made by student of Queen Mary to capture Reggie the Lion – "A further attempt to obtain a mascot [by QMUL] was made in 1935 and deserved a better result. One Wednesday afternoon, a well organized party assembled by devious routes in King's College and at zero hour took up their appointed posts. The porters were confined to their lodge and all entrances and exits were guarded. But Reggie the lion was chained in steel to the wall, and the porters had telephoned the police for aid! A hasty retreat was made with no casualties."

A triumph for Queen Mary students came in 1923 during a football cup final between Queen Mary and University College. "The match was to be played on the Arsenal Football Club ground at Highbury, and the rag-committee had obtained an option on a fleet of donkeys and carts on which it was proposed to drive down to the ground. Unknown to this committee a few research chemists thought of something better. They prepared a special paint, that would not easily wash off, and in the early hours of the morning, dodging the police on their beats they set to work on the imposing frontage of University College. Next morning, London was startled to find the place resplendent in the college colours, light blue and gold! An irate telephone call from Sir Gregory Foster to the Principal exposed the infamous deed. The cup-final match was promptly placed "out of bounds", but after many violent student demonstrations this ban was lifted just before lunch and the College supporters flocked down to Highbury under promise to abstain from ragging. University College won the match 5–4, and at the end called for three cheers for the "College of Decorators". The Union Society had to pay the bill of £50 for the removal of the paint. But we think it well worth it."

See also 
 College rivalry

References

External links 
 King's College London's Archives & Special Collections
 
 

King's College London
University College London
Rivalry